Tidiane Keita (born 18 September 1996) is a French professional footballer who plays as a midfielder for  club Dunkerque.

Club career
Having trained at Toulouse, Keita spent two seasons with US Albi and three seasons with Colomiers. On 14 April 2019, Keita signed a three-year professional contract with US Orléans. He made his professional debut for Orléans in a 0–0 Ligue 2 tie with AS Nancy on 26 July 2019.

On 26 June 2022, Keita joined Dunkerque.

References

External links
 
 
 

1996 births
Living people
Association football midfielders
French footballers
French people of Malian descent
US Orléans players
USL Dunkerque players
Ligue 2 players
Championnat National players
Championnat National 2 players
Championnat National 3 players